The revenge of the , also known as the  or Akō vendetta, is a historical event in Japan in which a band of rōnin (lordless samurai) avenged the death of their master on 31 January 1703. The incident has since become legendary. It is one of the three major adauchi vendetta incidents in Japan, alongside the Revenge of the Soga Brothers and the Igagoe vendetta.

The story tells of a group of samurai who were left leaderless after their daimyō (feudal lord) Asano Naganori was compelled to perform seppuku (ritual suicide) for assaulting a powerful court official named Kira Yoshinaka. After waiting and planning for a year, the rōnin avenged their master's honor by killing Kira, knowing full well that the authorities would likely not tolerate this vendetta's completion and put them to death. Due to considerable public support in their favor, the authorities compromised by ordering the rōnin to commit seppuku as an honorable death for the crime of murder. This true story was popularised in Japanese culture as emblematic of the loyalty, sacrifice, persistence, and honor that people should display in their daily lives. The popularity of the tale grew during the Meiji era, during which Japan underwent rapid modernisation, and the legend became entrenched within discourses of national heritage and identity.

Fictionalised accounts of the tale of the forty-seven rōnin are known as Chūshingura. The story was popularised in numerous plays, including in the genres of bunraku and kabuki. Because of the censorship laws of the shogunate in the Genroku era, which forbade portrayal of current events, the names were changed. While the version given by the playwrights may have come to be accepted as historical fact by some, the first Chūshingura was written some 50 years after the event, and numerous historical records about the actual events that predate the Chūshingura survive.

The bakufu'''s censorship laws had relaxed somewhat 75 years after the events in question in the late 18th century when Japanologist Isaac Titsingh first recorded the story of the forty-seven rōnin as one of the significant events of the Genroku era. To this day, the story remains popular in Japan, and each year on 14 December, Sengakuji Temple, where Asano Naganori and the rōnin are buried, holds a festival commemorating the event.

Name

Story
For many years, the version of events retold by A. B. Mitford in Tales of Old Japan (1871) was generally considered authoritative. The sequence of events and the characters in this narrative were presented to a wide popular readership in the West. Mitford invited his readers to construe his story of the forty-seven rōnin as historically accurate; and while his version of the tale has long been considered a standard work, some of its details are now questioned. Nevertheless, even with plausible defects, Mitford's work remains a conventional starting point for further study.

Whether as a mere literary device or as a claim for ethnographic veracity, Mitford explains:

Mitford appended what he explained were translations of Sengaku-ji documents the author had examined personally. These were proffered as "proofs" authenticating the factual basis of his story. These documents were:
 ...the receipt given by the retainers of Kira Kōtsukē no Sukē's son in return for the head of their lord's father, which the priests restored to the family.
 ...a document explanatory of their conduct, a copy of which was found on the person of each of the forty-seven men, dated in the 15th year of Genroku, 12th month.
 ...a paper which the Forty-seven Rōnin laid upon the tomb of their master, together with the head of Kira Kôtsuké no Suké.

(See Tales of Old Japan for the widely known, yet significantly fictional narrative.)

Genesis of a tragedy

In 1701, two daimyō, Asano Takumi-no-Kami Naganori, the young daimyō of the Akō Domain (a small fiefdom in western Honshū), and Lord Kamei Korechika of the Tsuwano Domain, were ordered to arrange a fitting reception for the envoys of Emperor Higashiyama at Edo Castle, during their sankin-kōtai service to the shōgun.

Asano and Kamei were to be given instruction in the necessary court etiquette by Kira Kozuke-no-Suke Yoshinaka, a powerful official in the hierarchy of Tokugawa Tsunayoshi's shogunate. He allegedly became upset at them, either because of the insufficient presents they offered him (in the time-honored compensation for such an instructor), or because they would not offer bribes as he wanted. Other sources say that he was naturally rude and arrogant or that he was corrupt, which offended Asano, a devoutly moral Confucian. By some accounts, it also appears that Asano may have been unfamiliar with the intricacies of the shogunate court and failed to show the proper amount of deference to Kira. Whether Kira treated them poorly, insulted them, or failed to prepare them for fulfilling specific bakufu duties, offence was taken.

Initially, Asano bore all this stoically, while Kamei became enraged and prepared to kill Kira to avenge the insults. However, Kamei's quick-thinking counselors averted disaster for their lord and clan (for all would have been punished if Kamei had killed Kira) by quietly giving Kira a large bribe; Kira thereupon began to treat Kamei nicely, which calmed Kamei.

However, Kira allegedly continued to treat Asano harshly because he was upset that the latter had not emulated his companion. Finally, Kira insulted Asano, calling him a country boor with no manners, and Asano could restrain himself no longer. At the Matsu no Ōrōka, the main grand corridor that interconnects the Shiro-shoin (白書院) and the Ōhiroma of the Honmaru Goten (本丸御殿) residence, Asano lost his temper and attacked Kira with a dagger, wounding him in the face with his first strike; his second missed and hit a pillar. Guards then quickly separated them.

Kira's wound was hardly serious, but the attack on a shogunate official within the boundaries of the shōguns residence was considered a grave offence. Any kind of violence, even the drawing of a katana, was completely forbidden in Edo Castle. The daimyō of Akō had removed his dagger from its scabbard within Edo Castle, and for that offence, he was ordered to kill himself by seppuku. Asano's goods and lands were to be confiscated after his death, his family was to be ruined, and his retainers were to be made rōnin (leaderless).

This news was carried to Ōishi Kuranosuke Yoshio, Asano's principal counsellor, who took command and moved the Asano family away before complying with bakufu orders to surrender the castle to the agents of the government.

Revenge plot

Of Asano's over 300 men, 47, especially their leader Ōishi, refused to allow their lord to go unavenged, even though revenge had been prohibited in the case. They banded together, swearing a secret oath to avenge their master by killing Kira, even though they knew that they would be severely punished for doing so.

Kira was well guarded, however, and his residence had been fortified to prevent just such an event. The rōnin saw that they would have to lull the suspicions of Kira and other shogunate authorities, so they dispersed and became tradesmen and monks.

Ōishi took up residence in Kyoto and began to frequent brothels and taverns, as if nothing were further from his mind than revenge. Kira still feared a trap and sent spies to watch Asano's former retainers.

One day, as Ōishi was returning home drunk, he fell down in the street and went to sleep, and all the passers-by laughed at him. A Satsuma man was so infuriated by this behaviour on the part of a samurai—by his lack of courage to avenge his master as well as his current debauched behaviour—that he abused and insulted Ōishi, kicking him in the face (to even touch the face of a samurai was a great insult, let alone strike it) and spitting on him.

Not too long after, Ōishi divorced his loyal wife of twenty years so that no harm would come to her when the rōnin took their revenge. He sent her away with their two younger children to live with her parents; he gave their eldest boy, Chikara, the choice to stay and fight or to leave. Chikara remained with his father.

Ōishi began to act oddly and very unlike the composed samurai. He frequented geisha houses (particularly Ichiriki Chaya), drank nightly, and acted obscenely in public. Ōishi's men bought a geisha, hoping she would calm him. This was all a ruse to rid Ōishi of his spies.

Kira's agents reported all this to Kira, who became convinced that he was safe from Asano's retainers, that they must all be bad samurai indeed, without the courage to avenge their master after a year and a half. Thinking them harmless and lacking funds from his "retirement", he then reluctantly let down his guard.

The rest of the faithful rōnin now gathered in Edo, and in their roles as workmen and merchants gained access to Kira's house, becoming familiar with the layout of the house and the character of all within. One of the retainers (Okano Kinemon Kanehide) went so far as to marry the daughter of the builder of the house, to obtain the house's design plans. All of this was reported to Ōishi. Others gathered arms and secretly transported them to Edo, another offence.

Attack

After two years, when Ōishi was convinced that Kira was thoroughly off his guard, and everything was ready, he fled from Kyoto, avoiding the spies who were watching him, and the entire band gathered at a secret meeting place in Edo to renew their oaths.

The Ako Incident occurred on 31 January 1703 when the rōnin of Asano Naganori stormed the residence of Kira Yoshinaka in Edo. (While the attack was carried out on 31 January, the event is commemorated annually on 14 December in Japan). According to a carefully laid-out plan, they split up into two groups and attacked, armed with swords and bows. One group, led by Ōishi, was to attack the front gate; the other, led by his son, Ōishi Chikara, was to attack the house via the back gate. A drum would sound the simultaneous attack, and a whistle would signal that Kira was dead.

Once Kira was dead, they planned to cut off his head and lay it as an offering on their master's tomb. They would then turn themselves in and wait for their expected sentence of death. All this had been confirmed at a final dinner, at which Ōishi had asked them to be careful and spare women, children, and other helpless people.

Ōishi had four men scale the fence and enter the porter's lodge, capturing and tying up the guard there. He then sent messengers to all the neighboring houses, to explain that they were not robbers but retainers out to avenge the death of their master, and that no harm would come to anyone else: the neighbors were all safe. One of the rōnin climbed to the roof and loudly announced to the neighbors that the matter was an act of revenge (katakiuchi, 敵討ち). The neighbors, who all hated Kira, were relieved and did nothing to hinder the raiders.

After posting archers (some on the roof) to prevent those in the house (who had not yet awakened) from sending for help, Ōishi sounded the drum to start the attack. Ten of Kira's retainers held off the party attacking the house from the front, but Ōishi Chikara's party broke into the back of the house.

Kira, in terror, took refuge in a closet in the veranda, along with his wife and female servants. The rest of his retainers, who slept in barracks outside, attempted to come into the house to his rescue. After overcoming the defenders at the front of the house, the two parties led by father and son joined up and fought the retainers who came in. The latter, perceiving that they were losing, tried to send for help, but their messengers were killed by the archers posted to prevent that eventuality.

Eventually, after a fierce struggle, the last of Kira's retainers were subdued; in the process, the rōnin killed 16 of Kira's men and wounded 22, including his grandson. Of Kira, however, there was no sign. They searched the house, but all they found were crying women and children. They began to despair, but Ōishi checked Kira's bed, and it was still warm, so he knew he could not be far away.

Death of Kira
A renewed search disclosed an entrance to a secret courtyard hidden behind a large scroll; the courtyard held a small building for storing charcoal and firewood, where two hidden armed retainers were overcome and killed. A search of the building disclosed a man hiding; he attacked the searcher with a dagger, but the man was easily disarmed. He refused to say who he was, but the searchers felt sure it was Kira, and sounded the whistle. The rōnin gathered, and Ōishi, with a lantern, saw that it was indeed Kira—as a final proof, his head bore the scar from Asano's attack.

Ōishi went on his knees, and in consideration of Kira's high rank, respectfully addressed him, telling him they were retainers of Asano, come to avenge him as true samurai should, and inviting Kira to die as a true samurai should, by killing himself. Ōishi indicated he personally would act as a kaishakunin ("second", the one who beheads a person committing seppuku to spare them the indignity of a lingering death) and offered him the same dagger that Asano had used to kill himself. However, no matter how much they entreated him, Kira crouched, speechless and trembling. At last, seeing it was useless to continue asking, Ōishi ordered the other rōnin to pin him down and killed him by cutting off his head with the dagger. They then extinguished all the lamps and fires in the house (lest any cause the house to catch fire and start a general fire that would harm the neighbors) and left, taking Kira's head.

One of the rōnin, the ashigaru Terasaka Kichiemon, was ordered to travel to Akō and report that their revenge had been completed. (Though Kichiemon's role as a messenger is the most widely accepted version of the story, other accounts have him running away before or after the battle, or being ordered to leave before the rōnin turned themselves in.)

Aftermath

As day was breaking, they quickly carried Kira's head from his residence to their lord's grave in Sengaku-ji temple, marching about ten kilometers across the city, causing a great stir on the way. The story of the revenge spread quickly, and everyone on their path praised them and offered them refreshment.

On arriving at the temple, the remaining 46 rōnin (all except Terasaka Kichiemon) washed and cleaned Kira's head in a well, and laid it, and the fateful dagger, before Asano's tomb. They then offered prayers at the temple and gave the abbot of the temple all of the money they had left, asking him to bury them decently and offer prayers for them. They then turned themselves in; the group was broken into four parts and put under guard of four different daimyō. During this time, two of Kira's friends came to collect his head for burial; the temple still has the original receipt for the head, which the friends and the priests who dealt with them had all signed.

The shogunate officials in Edo were in a quandary. The samurai had followed the precepts by avenging the death of their lord; but they had also defied the shogunate's authority by exacting revenge, which had been prohibited. In addition, the shōgun received a number of petitions from the admiring populace on behalf of the rōnin. As expected, the rōnin were sentenced to death for the murder of Kira; but the shōgun finally resolved the quandary by ordering them to honorably commit seppuku instead of having them executed as criminals. Each of the assailants ended his life in a ritualistic fashion. Ōishi Chikara, the youngest, was only 15 years old on the day the raid took place, and only 16 the day he committed seppuku.

This has caused a considerable amount of confusion ever since, with some people referring to the "forty-six rōnin"; this refers to the group put to death by the shōgun, while the actual attack party numbered forty-seven. The forty-seventh rōnin, identified as Terasaka Kichiemon, eventually returned from his mission and was pardoned by the shōgun (some say on account of his youth). He lived until the age of 87, dying around 1747, and was then buried with his comrades. The assailants who died by seppuku were subsequently interred on the grounds of Sengaku-ji, in front of the tomb of their master. The clothes and arms they wore are still preserved in the temple to this day, along with the drum and whistle; their armor was all home-made, as they had not wanted to arouse suspicion by purchasing any.

The Satsuma man who had mocked and spat on Ōishi as he lay drunk in the street was also buried there. He addressed Ōishi's grave, begged for forgiveness for his actions and for thinking that the latter was not a true samurai. He then committed suicide and was buried next to Ōishi.

The tombs at Sengaku-ji became a place of great veneration, and people flocked there to pray. The graves at the temple have been visited by a great many people throughout the years since the Genroku era.

Re-establishment of the Asano clan's lordship
Though the revenge is often viewed as an act of loyalty, there had been a second goal, to re-establish the Asanos' lordship and find a place for their fellow samurai to serve. Hundreds of samurai who had served under Asano had been left jobless, and many were unable to find employment, as they had served under a disgraced family. Many lived as farmers or did simple handicrafts to make ends meet. The revenge of the forty-seven rōnin cleared their names, and many of the unemployed samurai found jobs soon after the rōnin had been sentenced to their honorable end.

Asano Daigaku Nagahiro, Naganori's younger brother and heir, was allowed by the Tokugawa shogunate to re-establish his name, though his territory was reduced to a tenth of the original.

Members

Below are the names of the 47 rōnin in the following form: family name – pseudonym (kemyō) – real name (imina). Alternative readings are listed in italics.

Criticism
The rōnin spent more than 14 months waiting for the "right time" for their revenge. It was Yamamoto Tsunetomo, author of the Hagakure, who asked the well known question: "What if, nine months after Asano's death, Kira had died of an illness?" His answer was that the forty-seven rōnin would have lost their only chance at avenging their master. Even if they had claimed, then, that their dissipated behavior was just an act, that in just a little more time they would have been ready for revenge, who would have believed them? They would have been forever remembered as cowards and drunkards—bringing eternal shame to the name of the Asano clan. The right thing for the rōnin to do, writes Yamamoto, was to attack Kira and his men immediately after Asano's death. The rōnin would probably have suffered defeat, as Kira was ready for an attack at that time—but this was unimportant.

Ōishi was too obsessed with success, according to Yamamoto. He conceived his convoluted plan to ensure that they would succeed at killing Kira, which is not a proper concern in a samurai: the important thing was not the death of Kira, but for the former samurai of Asano to show outstanding courage and determination in an all-out attack against the Kira house, thus winning everlasting honor for their dead master. Even if they had failed to kill Kira, even if they had all perished, it would not have mattered, as victory and defeat have no importance. By waiting a year, they improved their chances of success but risked dishonoring the name of their clan, the worst sin a samurai can commit.

In the arts

The tragedy of the forty-seven rōnin has been one of the most popular themes in Japanese art and has lately even begun to make its way into Western art.

Immediately following the event, there were mixed feelings among the intelligentsia about whether such vengeance had been appropriate. Many agreed that, given their master's last wishes, the rōnin had done the right thing, but were undecided about whether such a vengeful wish was proper. Over time, however, the story became a symbol of loyalty to one's master and later, of loyalty to the emperor. Once this happened, the story flourished as a subject of drama, storytelling, and visual art.

Plays
The incident immediately inspired a succession of kabuki and bunraku plays; the first, The Night Attack at Dawn by the Soga, appeared only two weeks after the ronin died. It was shut down by the authorities, but many others soon followed, initially in Osaka and Kyoto, farther away from the capital. Some even took the story as far as Manila, to spread the story to the rest of Asia.

The most successful of the adaptations was a bunraku puppet play called Kanadehon Chūshingura (now simply called Chūshingura, or "Treasury of Loyal Retainers"), written in 1748 by Takeda Izumo and two associates; it was later adapted into a kabuki play, which is still one of Japan's most popular.

In the play, to avoid the attention of the censors, the events are transferred into the distant past, to the 14th century reign of shōgun Ashikaga Takauji. Asano became En'ya Hangan Takasada, Kira became Kō no Moronao and Ōishi became Ōboshi Yuranosuke Yoshio; the names of the rest of the rōnin were disguised to varying degrees. The play contains a number of plot twists that do not reflect the real story: Moronao tries to seduce En'ya's wife, and one of the rōnin dies before the attack because of a conflict between family and warrior loyalty (another possible cause of the confusion between forty-six and forty-seven).

Opera
The story was turned into an opera, Chūshingura, by Shigeaki Saegusa in 1997.

Cinema and television
The play has been made into a movie at least six times in Japan, the earliest starring Onoe Matsunosuke. The film's release date is questioned, but placed between 1910 and 1917. It has been aired on the Jidaigeki Senmon Channel (Japan) with accompanying benshi narration. In 1941, the Japanese military commissioned director Kenji Mizoguchi, who would later direct Ugetsu, to make Genroku Chūshingura. They wanted a ferocious morale booster based on the familiar rekishi geki ("historical drama") of The Loyal 47 Ronin. Instead, Mizoguchi chose for his source Mayama Chūshingura, a cerebral play dealing with the story. The film was a commercial failure, having been released in Japan one week before the attack on Pearl Harbor. The Japanese military and most audiences found the first part to be too serious, but the studio and Mizoguchi both regarded it as so important that Part Two was put into production, despite lukewarm reception to Part One. The film wasn't shown in America until the 1970s.

The 1962 film version directed by Hiroshi Inagaki, Chūshingura, is most familiar to Western audiences. In it, Toshirō Mifune appears in a supporting role as spearman Tawaraboshi Genba. Mifune was to revisit the story several times in his career. In 1971 he appeared in the 52-part television series Daichūshingura as Ōishi, while in 1978 he appeared as Lord Tsuchiya in the epic Swords of Vengeance (Akō-jō danzetsu).

Many Japanese television shows, including single programs, short series, single seasons, and even year-long series such as Daichūshingura and the more recent NHK Taiga drama Genroku Ryōran, recount the events. Among both films and television programs, some are quite faithful to the Chūshingura, while others incorporate unrelated material or alter details. In addition, gaiden dramatize events and characters not in the Chūshingura. Kon Ichikawa directed another version in 1994. In 2004, Mitsumasa Saitō directed a nine-episode mini-series starring Ken Matsudaira, who had also starred in a 1999 49-episode TV series of the Chūshingura entitled Genroku Ryōran. In Hirokazu Koreeda's 2006 film Hana yori mo nao, the story was used as a backdrop, with one of the ronin being a neighbour of the protagonists.

Most recently, it was made into a 2013 American movie titled 47 Ronin, starring Keanu Reeves, and then again into a more stylized 2015 version titled Last Knights.

Woodblock prints
The forty-seven rōnin is one of the most popular themes in woodblock prints, or ukiyo-e and many well-known artists have made prints portraying either the original events, scenes from the play, or the actors. One book on subjects depicted in woodblock prints devotes no fewer than seven chapters to the history of the appearance of this theme in woodblocks. Among the artists who produced prints on this subject are Utamaro, Toyokuni, Hokusai, Kunisada, Hiroshige, and Yoshitoshi. However, probably the most widely known woodblocks in the genre are those of Kuniyoshi, who produced at least eleven separate complete series on this subject, along with more than twenty triptychs.

Literature
 The earliest known account of the Akō incident in the West was published in 1822 in Isaac Titsingh's posthumously-published book Illustrations of Japan.
 The rōnin are the main protagonists in a 2014 comic miniseries by Stan Sakai (art) and Mike Richardson (author).
 The incident is the subject of Jorge Luis Borges' short story "The Uncivil Teacher of Court Etiquette Kôtsuké no Suké", included in the 1935 collection A Universal History of Infamy.

 Gallery 

 References 

 Citations 

 Sources 

 Allyn, John. (1981). The Forty-Seven Ronin Story. New York.
 Benesch, Oleg (2014). Inventing the Way of the Samurai: Nationalism, Internationalism, and Bushido in Modern Japan. Oxford: Oxford University Press.
 Dickens, Frederick V. (1930) Chushingura, or The Loyal League. London.
 Forbes, Andrew; Henley, David (2012). Forty-Seven Ronin: Tsukioka Yoshitoshi Edition. Chiang Mai: Cognoscenti Books. ASIN: B00ADQGLB8
 Forbes, Andrew; Henley, David (2012). Forty-Seven Ronin: Utagawa Kuniyoshi Edition. Chiang Mai: Cognoscenti Books. ASIN: B00ADQM8II
 Keene, Donald. (1971). Chushingura: A Puppet Play. New York.
 
 Robinson, B.W. (1982). Kuniyoshi: The Warrior Prints. Ithaca.
 Sato, Hiroaki. (1995). Legends of the Samurai. New York.
 Steward, Basil. (1922). Subjects Portrayed in Japanese Colour-Prints. New York.
 
 Weinberg, David R. et al. (2001). Kuniyoshi: The Faithful Samurai. Leiden.

Further reading
 Borges, Jorge Luís (1935). The Uncivil Teacher of Court Etiquette Kôtsuké no Suké; A Universal History of Infamy, Buenos aires 1954, Emecé 1945 
 Harper, Thomas (2019). 47: The True Story of the Vendetta of the 47 Ronin from Akô . Leete's Island Books. .
 Turnbull, Stephen (2011). The Revenge of the 47 Ronin, Edo 1703; Osprey Raid Series #23, Osprey Publishing. 

External links
 Robson, Lucia St. Clair (1991). The Tokaido Road. Forge Books. New York.
 Chushingura and the Samurai Tradition – Comparisons of the accuracy of accounts by Mitford, Murdoch and others, as well as much other useful material, by noted scholars of Japan
 Ako's Forty-Seven Samurai – Web site produced by students at Akō High School; contains the story of the 47 ronin's story, and images of wooden votive tablets of the 47 ronin in the Ōishi Shrine, Akō
 The Trouble with Terasaka: The Forty-Seventh Ronin and the Chushingura Imagination by Henry D. Smith II, Japan Review'', 2004, 16:3–65
 Five different woodblock print versions of the story by Ando Hiroshige
 National Diet Library: photograph of Sengaku-ji (1893); photograph of Sengaku-ji (1911)
 Yoshitoshi, 47 Ronin series (1860)
 Discover the tales of Chushingura, the 47 Ronins 

1701 in Japan
1703 in Japan
Assassinations in Japan
Feuds
Japanese folklore
Mass suicides
Samurai
Suicides by seppuku
Traditional stories